Mari is a historic ruin in Mianwali District, Punjab, Pakistan. According to the district Gazetteer of Mianwali of 1915 the remains of Mari (and the nearby ruin of Kafir Kot) "are indication of the existence of a Hindu civilization of considerable importance and antiquity". The ruins of Mari are located in  Mianwali Tehsil at 32° 57' 32″ N,  71° 35' 7″ E.

According to the 1915 District Gazetteer:

References

Mianwali District
Ruins in Pakistan